Szymki is a village in the administrative district of Gmina Michałowo, within Białystok County, Podlaskie Voivodeship, in north-eastern Poland, close to the border with Belarus.

References

Szymki
Nowogródek Voivodeship (1507–1795)
Volkovyssky Uyezd
Białystok Voivodeship (1919–1939)
Belastok Region